The All-Women Ultra Marathon (AWUM) is an endurance race which is held each year in Cebu City, Philippines.  As of 2013, it is the only ultra marathon which is designed especially for women.

The All-Women Ultra Marathon is planned to coincide with the annual International Women's Day in March, and usually starts at 10 p.m. on the Saturday nearest to that day.

The race is organized by the Thinktank ultra marathoners group. The aid stations at the race are sponsored and operated by volunteers from several running clubs in the area.

The first All-Women Ultra Marathon was held on March 10, 2012, and was organized by the Ungo Runners and the Cebu Ultramarathoners Club.
The distance of the race is 50 Kilometers.

In 2014, 188 women participated in the race, up from 150 in 2013.

References

External links 

 AWUM Facebook Fan Page
 International Women's Day
 All Women Ultra Marathon 2013 Photos Gallery
 AWUM 2012: BDM 160KM 2nd Placer Haide Acuna’s Ultra Running & Eyeliner Talk
 A CDO-ana Stirred the Cebuanas at All Women Ultra-Marathon 2013

Sports in Cebu
Ultramarathons
Women's marathons
Marathons in the Philippines
Recurring sporting events established in 2012
2012 establishments in the Philippines